= Emmanuel Macron, les coulisses d'une victoire =

2017 French documentary film

- Directed by: Yann L'Hénoret
- Country of origin: France
- Original language: French

Production
- Running time: 90 minutes

Original release
- Network: TF1
- Release: May 8, 2017

Emmanuel Macron, les coulisses d'une victoire is a 2017 French-language documentary film directed by Yann L'Hénoret. It is about Emmanuel Macron's successful bid in the French presidential election. It was first shown on TF1 on 8 May 2017, when it was watched by 4.4 million viewers.
